Pakistan is one of the most seismically active countries in the world, being crossed by several major faults. As a result, earthquakes in Pakistan occur often and are destructive.

Geology

Pakistan geologically overlaps both the Eurasian and Indian tectonic plates. Balochistan, the Federally Administered Tribal Areas, Khyber Pakhtunkhwa and Gilgit-Baltistan provinces lie on the southern edge of the Eurasian Plate on the Iranian Plateau. Sindh, Punjab and Azad Jammu & Kashmir provinces lie on the north-western edge of the Indian plate in South Asia. Hence this region is prone to violent earthquakes, as the two tectonic plates collide.

Earthquakes

See also
List of faults in Pakistan
National Disaster Management Authority
Earthquake Reconstruction & Rehabilitation Authority

References

Sources

Further reading

External links
Northern Pakistan 1974 December 28 12:11:43 UTC Magnitude 6.2  USGS accessed Jan 2009

 
Earthquakes
Pakistan